Donald Broughton (4 February 1931 – 11 December 1987) was an Australian cricketer. He played one first-class match for Tasmania in 1952/53.

See also
 List of Tasmanian representative cricketers

References

External links
 

1931 births
1987 deaths
Australian cricketers
Tasmania cricketers
Cricketers from Hobart